Yancy Derringer is an American action/adventure series that was broadcast on CBS from October 2, 1958, to September 24, 1959, with Jock Mahoney in the title role. It was broadcast from 8:30 to 9 p.m. Eastern Time on Thursdays.

Background

The show was produced by Derringer Productions and filmed in Hollywood by Desilu Productions. Derringer Productions consisted of half interest for Warren Lewis and Don Sharpe as executive producers, a quarter interest to Jock Mahoney for starring in the series, and a quarter interest to Richard Sale and Mary Loos, husband and wife, as creators. Desilu had just completed the 1956 series The Adventures of Jim Bowie, which was also set principally in New Orleans. The show's sponsor was S. C. Johnson & Son, and Klear floor wax was a regular sponsor.

Sale and Loos based the series on "The Devil Made a Derringer", a short story by Sale that appeared in All-American Fiction in 1938. Sale was one of the highest-paid pulp writers of the 1930s. The story was never mentioned, but it was about a destitute aristocrat and troublemaker who returns to New Orleans three years after the American Civil War. In the story, Derringer has no first name; "Yancy" was added for the television series.

Overview
The eponymous character, Yancy Derringer, is an adventurer and gambler. He is a former Confederate Army soldier who has returned to New Orleans, Louisiana, in 1868, three years after the end of the American Civil War, in the southern Reconstruction Era. The state is under Union control and martial law. Life goes on in New Orleans despite the fact that the city's atmosphere is forbidding, filled with trepidation and mourning. The Derringer family itself paid a heavy price in both lives and property during the Civil War. Yancy's brother David and his father Yancy Sr., died in the conflict.

Widely respected by all parts of New Orleans society as a Southerner who never surrendered, Derringer is recruited by the Federal City Administrator, John Colton, to work as a secret agent; and only Colton knows of his special role. Often at the beginning of an episode, Colton, a former Union Army colonel, asks Yancy to help solve New Orleans' present threat; and often, usually at the end of an episode, he arrests Yancy for breaking the law to do it. Yancy agrees to be Colton's "huckleberry," because Yancy feels the United States should be one nation again. Huckleberry was just one of many unique Southern slang terms creator Richard Sale brought into use during the show.

Although Yancy is based out of New Orleans, his riverboat and propensity for adventure mean that some episodes take him far away from Louisiana. Some stories take place as far away as Nevada, and California.

Tommy Mara recorded the show's theme with an orchestra and chorus in 1959 for Felsted Records (Felsted 8561).

Cast and characters

Main
Jock Mahoney - Yancy Derringer

 Yancy lives at the family plantation, Waverly, and also owns a riverboat, the Sultana. (The actual riverboat of the same name sank from a fire/explosion on April 27, 1865, with a great loss of life, including returning Union soldiers.) A lover of fine cuisine and the high life, he spends much of his leisure time at Madame Francine's Club (an exclusive members-only gambling house), the Sazerac Restaurant, or at the Charter House Restaurant, whose specialty is French cuisine.
When called to action, Yancy's weapons of choice are four-barrel Sharps pepperbox derringer handguns carried concealed (one held by a clamp inside the top of his hat, one in his vest's left pocket under his jacket and one up his jacket's left sleeve in a wrist holster) and a knife in his belt. (A belt buckle inset with a toy single-barrel derringer, sold by Mattel at the time and popularly associated with Yancy, did not resemble anything that the character actually used.) He is an expert marksman. He also carries a cane or a riding crop with hidden swords and is said to have iron fists: one punch and his opponent remains unconscious for a day. Yancy dresses elegantly, most often in a white suit with a long coat, ruffled white shirt, a silk vest, a sash instead of a belt, a black under-the-collar bow tie, and a white flat-topped straw hat with curled brim.
X Brands - Pahoo Ka-Ta-Wah
 Yancy's sidekick, Pahoo-Ka-Ta-Wah, is a silent Pawnee American Indian who communicates only by sign language. Pahoo-Ka-Ta-Wah is Pawnee for "wolf who stands in water" (as mentioned in the first episode). Although Pahoo is short on talk, he is long on action. Beneath a blanket wrapped about his body, he carries a sawed-off double-barreled shotgun loaded with split buckshot, which he wields in emergencies. Most of the time, however, he uses a throwing knife sheathed on his back.

Kevin Hagen - John Colton

 John Colton is the city administrator, and a hard-nosed, incorruptible leader who works tirelessly to clean up New Orleans. Colton is also clever, and knows that his position would be untenable if he were personally caught using questionable methods to clamp down on crime. He therefore uses Yancy to unofficially deal with situations that cannot be resolved by conventional means.

Frances Bergen – Madame Francine
Yancy's recurring love interest is Madame Francine.  She is the strong-willed, beautiful owner of a members-only gambling house in New Orleans, and she or her business are often involved in Yancy's adventures.  Her real name is Nora and she is actually Irish.

Robert McCord, III – Captain Amos Fry

 Captain Amos Fry is the local head of the U.S. Secret Service who works closely with Colton to combat lawlessness in New Orleans.  Fry does not know of Derringer's unpaid work as an espionage agent; often the amiable but plodding Fry is working on combating a problem in a legal manner, while Derringer—unconstrained by official law-enforcement policies and procedures—uses decidedly more unorthodox, colorful and possibly borderline-illegal methods to nullify the threat.

Richard Devon – Jody Barker

 Jody Barker is a respectable-looking Bourbon Street pickpocket.  Yancy and Francine were wise to his ways, and frequently stopped him from fleecing club members.  However, he was a useful source of information about doings in the criminal underworld, and sometimes participated in certain 'sting' operations for Yancy.

Larry J. Blake – Turnkey

 Yancy spent so much time in the local jail (usually put there by Colton or Fry), he became great pals with the jailer, who was addressed as "Turnkey". The genial Turnkey (played by Larry J. Blake) often played poker in the cells with Yancy, and, sympathetic to Yancy's situation, sometimes aided in (or at least turned a blind eye towards) Yancy's escape plans.

Bill Walker – Obadiah

 Obadiah is Derringer's African-American servant. A dignified pillar of the community, he is the head of a committee that represents "thousands of law-abiding citizens of New Orleans" in bringing a petition to the city administrator in the episode "V as in Voodoo".  A club doorman addressed as Jeremiah is seen in a few episodes, but this character has no lines and is not credited.

Recurring

Madame Francine's club hostesses
 Patricia Blair – Goldy
 Charlene James – Pearl Girl
 Joan Boston – Opal 
 Jane Burgess – Chrystal

Sultana crew
 Woody Chambliss – Captain Tom of the Sultana
 Gene Collins – Willy Quill, Sultana pilot

Others
 Kelly Thordsen – Colorado Charlie
 Lisa Lu – Miss Mandarin
 Marvin Bryan – Lt. Bacon
 Margaret Field (billed as Maggie Mahoney) – Bridget Malone 
 Sandy Kenyon – Willy Nilly, bartender at the Sazerac
 Claude Akins – Toby Cook
 Robert Lowery (actor) – Blair Devon
 Robert McCord III – Captain Amos Fry
 Beverly Garland – Coco LaSalle
 Noreen Nash – Agatha Colton
 Lee Kendall – Blackjack Benson
 Joan Taylor – Lavina Lake
 Mickey Morton – Wee Willie Benson
 James Foxx – The O'Hara
 John Qualen – Captain Sven Larsen

Guest stars

 Julie Adams – Amanda Eaton in "Return to New Orleans"
 Nick Adams – Grand Duke Alexis in "The Night the Russians Landed" 
 Jack Albertson – Blind Bill in "Mayhem at the Market"
 Norm Alden – Crenshaw in "Marble Fingers"
 James Anderson – Fitch in "The Louisiana Dude"
 John Alderson – Marble Fingers in "Marble Fingers"
 Mari Aldon – Celeste Duval in "Mayhem at the Market"
 John Anderson – Wayne Raven in “Outlaw at Liberty”
 Richard Arlen – General Hugh Morgan in "A State of Crisis"
 Raymond Bailey – Colonel Duval in "Mayhem at the Market"
 Patricia Barry – Patricia Tappworth in “Thunder on the River"
 Arthur Batanides – Dink Saxon in “A Game of Chance“
 Charles Bateman – Captain Blythe in "A State of Crisis"
 Gerrie Bender – Katy in "The Night the Russians Landed" 
 Val Benedict – Gunman in “Outlaw at Liberty”
 Nesdon Booth – Conductor in “Fire on the Frontier”
 Joan Boston – Opal in “The Wayward Warrior”
 Don Brodie – Ticket Seller in “Two Tickets to Promontory”
 Charles Bronson – Rogue Donovan in “Hell and High Water"
 Lillian Bronson – Carrie Meade in "Mayhem at the Market"
 Hillary Brooke – Julia Bulette in "The Louisiana Dude"
 Naaman Brown – Dr. YaYa in “V as in Voodoo”
 John Bryant – Joshua Devon in “"Three Knaves from New Haven"
 Paul Bryar – Harry Kidd in “V as in Voodoo”
 Walter Burke – Sneaky Joe in “Panic in Town"
 Jean Byron – Dorinda Ashton in “Ticket to Natchez”
 Thom Carney – Army Clerk in "A State of Crisis" and Conductor in “Gone But Not Forgotten“
 Robert Carricart – Thaddeus Stevens in “Fire on the Frontier”
 Zachary Charles – Dan Fitz in "A Bullet for Bridget"
 Ralph Clanton – Benjamin Quade in “A Game of Chance“
 John Cliff – Nat Greer in "The Louisiana Dude"
 Ann Codee – Madame Marie in "An Ace Called Spade"
 Booth Coleman – Henry Duval in "The Louisiana Dude"
 Charles Cooper – Harmon Steele in "Return to New Orleans"
 Robert Cornthwaite – Mathew Brady in "Collector's Item"
 Walter Coy – Slade Donovan in "A State of Crisis"
 Kathleen Crowley – Desiree in "Marble Fingers"
 Patricia Cutts – Lady Charity in “Hell and High Water"
 John Damler – Man in “Two Tickets to Promontory”
 Ruby Dandridge – Lily Rose Beam in “V as in Voodoo”
 Ray Danton – Spade Stuart in "An Ace Called Spade"
 Jim Davis – Bullet Pike in “Two Tickets to Promontory”
 John Dehner – Colonel Tate in "Memo to a Firing Squad"
 Brad Dexter – Charles Hammond in “V as in Voodoo”
 Val Dufour – Dean Salsbury in "Old Dixie"
 Joan Dupuis – Carrie in “Panic in Town"
 Kaye Elhardt – Sally Snow in “Outlaw at Liberty”
 Gene Evans – Lonesome Jackson in "The Saga of Lonesome Jackson"
 Frances Fong – Ruby in “The Quiet Firecracker”
 Dick Foran – Mr. Halligan in "Two of a Kind"
 Michael Forest – Pierre in "The Fair Freebooter"
 Louise Fletcher – twins Miss Nellie and Miss Alithia in "Old Dixie"
 Charles Fredericks – Jack Dingo in “Fire on the Frontier”
 Regina Gleason – Margot Chatham in “Fire on the Frontier”
 Leo Gordon – Lance Carter in "The Belle from Boston"
 Fred Graham – Laney in "A Bullet for Bridget"
 Otis Greene – Roy in "Return to New Orleans"
 Charles Gray – Clay Wellman in “Gone But Not Forgotten“
 Virginia Grey – Emily DuBois in “V as in Voodoo”
 Patricia Hardy – Gloria Stafford in "The Loot from Richmond"
 Holly Harris – Madame Hauptmann in “Panic in Town"
 Joe Haworth – Lieutenant in “Hell and High Water"
 Maggie Hayes – Ruby in "The Saga of Lonesome Jackson"
 Bill Henry – Fargo in “Gone But Not Forgotten“
 Reed Howes – American Captain in "The Night the Russians Landed" 
 Harry Jackson – Professor Bates in “The Wayward Warrior”
 Joyce Jameson – Bonnie Mason in “Gone But Not Forgotten“
 Roy Jensen – Captain MacBain in “Longhair”
 Edwin Jerome – Claude de Graaf in “"Three Knaves from New Haven"
 Chubby Johnson – Spinner in "Old Dixie"
 Betty Lou Keim – Julie Randall in “Gone But Not Forgotten“
 Edward Kemmer – Dr. Frank Bishop in “Panic in Town"
 George Keymas – Biloxi in "Marble Fingers"
 Brett King – Jesse James in "Outlaw at Liberty"
 John Larch – Wayland Farr in “Two Tickets to Promontory”
 Mary LaRoche – Barbara Kent in "Nightmare on Bourbon Street"
 Harry Lauter – Francis Jordan in "Mayhem at the Market"
 Mary Lawrence – Priscilla Cole in “A Game of Chance“
 Ruta Lee – Romilly Vale in "Two of a Kind"
 Janet Lord – Elsie Tulliver in "Collector's Item"
 Karl Lukas – The Warrior in “The Wayward Warrior”
 Dayton Lummis – Judge Randall in “Gone But Not Forgotten“
 John Lupton – Major Alvin in "A State of Crisis"
 Rita Lynn – Vinnie Farr in “Two Tickets to Promontory”
 Theodore Marcuse – Alex Bristol in “The Quiet Firecracker”
 Lester Matthews – Jerrison Ames in "Old Dixie"
 Charles Maxwell – Barret Rankin in "A Bullet for Bridget"
 Ken Mayer – Shute O’Brien in “Thunder on the River"
 Dennis McCarthy – Hotel Clerk in “V as in Voodoo”
 Oliver McGowan – Dan Emerson in “Thunder on the River"
 Robert McQueeney – Howard Austin in “Two Tickets to Promontory”
 Tom McKee – General Cochran in "The Gun That Murdered Lincoln"
 Judi Meredith – Charlotte DuBois in “V as in Voodoo”
 Yvette Mimieux – Ricky in "Collector's Item"
 Irving Mitchell – Manager in “Panic in Town"
 Alberto Morin – Colonel Suvoroff in "The Night the Russians Landed" 
 Robert Nash – Conductor in “Two Tickets to Promontory”
 George Neise – Charles Hunter in "Return to New Orleans"
 Anne Neyland – Wilma in "Collector's Item"
 Doug Odney – Webster in “Thunder on the River"
 J. Pat O'Malley – Captain Billy of the Sultana in “The Quiet Firecracker”
 Tom Palmer – Hotel Clerk in “Fire on the Frontier”
 Dennis Patrick – Earle Bartley in "The Loot from Richmond"
 Steve Pendleton – Sheriff Anderson in "The Louisiana Dude"
 William Pullen – Henri in “The Wayward Warrior”
 Stuart Randall – Marshal Ike Milton in "Gone But Not Forgotten" and “Gone But Not Forgotten“
 Donald Randolph – Bart Ogilvie in “Panic in Town"
 Paula Raymond – Lucy Maridale in “Gallatin Street”
 Carl Benton Reid – General Stafford in "The Loot from Richmond"
 Bert Remsen – Major James Sampson in "The Gun That Murdered Lincoln"
 Alan Reynolds – Overseer in “Duel at the Oaks”
 Addison Richards – Judge Harper in "The Louisiana Dude"
 Mark Roberts – Matthew Younger in "Marble Fingers"
 Stephen Roberts – Sheriff Peterson in “Outlaw at Liberty”
 Bartlett Robinson – Stephen Quayne in "The Saga of Lonesome Jackson"
 Robert Rockwell – Phillip Hampton in "Memo to a Firing Squad"
 Kasey Rogers – Black-eyed Sue in "Marble Fingers"
 Willard Sage – Senator Tyson Yardley in "The Gun That Murdered Lincoln"
 Hugh Sanders – Phillip Lorme in “Duel at the Oaks”
 Luke Saucier Jr. – Collins in “Gone But Not Forgotten“
 Karen Sharpe – Patricia Lee in "A Game of Chance"
 Dan Sheridan – George Slocum in "Return to New Orleans"
 Mickey Simpson – Tennessee Slasher in “The Wayward Warrior”
 John Stephenson – Arthur Travers in “"Three Knaves from New Haven"
 Peggy Stewart – Karen Ogilvie in “Panic in Town"
 Harry Swoger – Big Jim Ogden in "The Louisiana Dude"
 Charles Tannen – Captain Brown in “The Quiet Firecracker”
 Dan Tobin – Alvin Watson in “Fire on the Frontier”
 Lee Van Cleef – Ike Milton/Frank James in “Outlaw at Liberty”
 John Vivyan – Charles LeBow in “Duel at the Oaks”
 Clessia Wade – Devil Dancer in “V as in Voodoo”
 Jean Willes – Jessie Belle in “The Quiet Firecracker”
 Bill Williams – Duke Winslow in “Ticket to Natchez”
 Grant Williams – Colonel Custer in “Longhair”
 Marie Windsor – Billie Jo James in “Ticket to Natchez”
 Victor Sen Yung – Hon Lee in “The Quiet Firecracker”

Reruns and syndication 
After the program's single year on network television, its reruns found audiences in repeats and in syndication. NBC bought all 34 episodes from Don Sharpe Productions to show as part of the network's afternoon Adventure Theatre anthology series beginning February 8, 1960. In 1961 it was broadcast in at least 43 TV markets,  including Chicago, Los Angeles, New York, and New Orleans. Official Films Inc. handled the distribution.

Critical response 
A review of the premiere episode in The New York Times called it "nonsensical" and "distinctive in its silliness". The review concluded, "Yancy Derringer is just too quaint to be entertaining."

The trade publication Broadcasting, in a review of the first episode, said, "this overloaded action series threatens to sink in the first patch of bayou quicksand."

Episodes

DVD release
On October 9, 2012, Timeless Media Group released the complete series on DVD for the first time in Region 1.

References

External links

National Firearms Museum – Sharps Derringer

1958 American television series debuts
1959 American television series endings
Fiction set in 1868
Television series set in the 1860s
American action adventure television series
CBS original programming
Television shows set in New Orleans
Television shows filmed in Los Angeles
Black-and-white American television shows
Television series by CBS Studios
Cultural depictions of George Armstrong Custer
Television series based on short fiction
American spy television series